Judy Hahn was the head coach of women's volleyball at Malone College in Canton, Ohio from 1981 to 1984.  While at Malone, she compiled a record of 126 wins and 33 losses.

Coaching awards
Hahn was named the NAIA District IV Coach of the Year while at Malone.

Personal life
Hahn graduated from Muskingum College with a bachelor's degree and earned a master's degree from Ashland University.

References

Malone University
Muskingum University alumni
Ashland University alumni
Living people
American volleyball coaches
Year of birth missing (living people)